"March of the Pigs" is a song by American industrial rock band Nine Inch Nails from their second studio album, The Downward Spiral (1994). It was released on February 25, 1994 as the album's lead single.

Composition
The song's high energy (analogous to a previous NIN track, "Wish"), segued by two piano breakdowns, has made it a staple of NIN's live concert performances. It is also one of the band's shortest hit songs, clocking in at just under three minutes.

Music videos
After abandoning a more elaborate version before filming could be completed, Reznor and the live band assembled for the then-impending Self Destruct Tour (featuring drummer Chris Vrenna, keyboard player James Woolley, guitarist Robin Finck and bassist/guitarist/keyboardist Danny Lohner) regrouped with director Peter Christopherson to film a stripped-down, minimalist music video for the song. The video, released in March 1994, features the band performing the song live in front of a white wall backdrop, with Reznor moving around aggressively, pushing the other band members and their instruments, and repeatedly tossing his microphone away. Throughout the video, stagehands visibly move into the frame to reset the equipment he knocks over, handing Reznor a microphone each time he needs to start singing again after an instrumental section. The bulk of the video appears to be filmed in one long take, with the camera zooming and panning continuously. When Reznor appeared as a guest programmer on the ABC Rage TV program, he explained that they just kept playing the song over and over to the point of exhaustion to get the final take. The video uses the live performance audio of the song recorded at the video shoot, rather than synchronizing the footage to the studio-recorded version from the album as most music videos do. This version of the song is also included on the "Closer" cassette single.

Portions of the earlier, uncompleted video are included on the Closure DVD disc image file that appeared on file-sharing network The Pirate Bay in December 2006; this file is believed to be a leak of a completed but (so far) officially unreleased deluxe DVD reissue of the band's 1997 VHS/laserdisc long form music video Closure. In this version of the video, the band performs the song in a red cave-like set with water at their feet, and a person with dwarfism appears.

Live performance videos of "March of the Pigs"  are included on each of the band's live releases: Closure, And All that Could Have Been, and Beside You in Time.

The single
The American "March of the Pigs" CD single contains two mixes of the title track, two remixes of its fellow The Downward Spiral track "Reptile", and "A Violet Fluid", a non-album instrumental track. In the UK, the single was released as a two-disc (each sold separately) CD single, adding a censored radio edit of "March of the Pigs" and "Big Man With a Gun" from The Downward Spiral. The disc art for this single features a curled-up millipede, an image that was later used on the cover of the single "Closer".

"March of the Pigs" peaked at number 98 on the Australian ARIA singles chart.

Thirteen years after its release, it debuted at number 9 and peaked at 6 on the Canadian Singles Chart.

Reception
"March of the Pigs" is widely considered one of Nine Inch Nails' best songs. In 2020, Kerrang! and Billboard ranked the song number three and number six, respectively, on their lists of the greatest Nine Inch Nails songs.

US CD
Nothing Records / TVT Records / Interscope Records / Atlantic Records 95938-2
TVT Records / Interscope Records INTDM-95938 (Reissue)

UK CD
Island Records CID 592 854 001-2 (Disc one)
Island Records CIDX 592 854 003-2 (Disc two)

Charts

Weekly charts

Year-end charts

Cover versions
 A cover version of "March of the Pigs" has been recorded by Mae for the 2006 compilation Punk Goes 90's.
 Eighteen Visions released a cover version of the song for the Metal Hammer Goes '90s compilation album.
 Horse the Band released a cover of the song for their EP Your Fault.
 Car Seat Headrest recorded a cover of the song for their 2021 EP MADLO: Influences, a collection of covers from artists that inspired the sound of their 2020 album Making a Door Less Open.

Appearances in other media
The song was released as a track for the video game Rock Band on February 26, 2008 for Xbox 360 and on February 28 for PlayStation 3. It was available as a standalone download or as part of the 'Nine Inch Nails' song pack (also including "The Perfect Drug" and "The Collector"). It was also featured on Rock Band Track Pack Vol. 1 for the PlayStation 2 and the Wii, alongside the PlayStation 3 and Xbox 360.

In a 1994 episode of Beavis & Butt-head, the boys watch the video for "March of the Pigs" and enjoy much of the song except for the piano parts. After Trent Reznor knocks over his microphone at the end of the video, Beavis says, "Thank you very much. We're Nine Inch Nails." somewhat dismissively, with Butt-head adding "Good night."

References

External links
March of the Pigs at nin.com, the official website
Halo 7 at NIN Collector
discogs.com: March of the Pigs (US CD5")
discogs.com: March of the Pigs (US 10")
discogs.com: March of the Pigs (UK 2xCD5")
discogs.com: March of the Pigs (UK 7")

1994 singles
Nine Inch Nails songs
Songs written by Trent Reznor
Song recordings produced by Flood (producer)
Nothing Records singles
Interscope Records singles
Song recordings produced by Trent Reznor
1994 songs
Industrial metal songs